Tamara de Braga Taxman (born February 24, 1947) is a Brazilian American actress, singer, television presenter and writer. She is best known for portraying the witch Leocádia, in the children's TV series Detetives do Prédio Azul.

Biography
Taxman was born in Woodstock, New York. Her father was from Rock Island and her mother was from Varginha, Minas Gerais. She went to Brazil at the age of three months.

Filmography

Television

Film

Stage

References

External links

1947 births
Living people
People from Woodstock, New York
American people of Brazilian descent
Brazilian people of American descent
Brazilian telenovela actresses
Brazilian television actresses
Brazilian film actresses
Brazilian stage actresses
American emigrants to Brazil